Sömek is a village in Silifke district of Mersin Province, Turkey. The population of Sömek   was 794  as of 2011 . Like most other settlements in Mersin Province, the area around Sömek has many ancient ruins. There are also the ruins of two churches which were built probably in the Byzantine era of 5th or 6th centuries. Although the east church has completely been demolished, an official archaeology group with the collaboration of Mersin University is working to unearth the west church. There are also ruins of various houses and cisterns around the east church.

References

Villages in Silifke District